New Floodwood is an unincorporated community in Athens County, in the U.S. state of Ohio.

History
An old variant name was Floodwood. A post office called Rock Oak was established in 1856, the name was changed to Floodwood in 1871, and the post office closed in 1883. (New) Floodwood was a mining community.

References

Unincorporated communities in Athens County, Ohio
1856 establishments in Ohio
Populated places established in 1856
Unincorporated communities in Ohio